Arachotia is a genus of moths of the family Zygaenidae, with species described from regions of Indochina and Southeast Asia.

Species
 Arachotia aenea Jordan, 1908, the Philippines
 Arachotia dadongshan Owada et Wang, 2021, China 
 Arachotia euglenia Jordan, 1908
 Arachotia flaviplaga Moore, 1879, India
 Arachotia hohuanshanensis Shih et Owada, 2021, central Taiwan 
 Arachotia hyalina Hering, 1925
 Arachotia quadricolor (Semper, 1898), the Philippines
 Arachotia nanling Owada et Wang, 2021, southern China
 Arachotia sapa Owada et Pham, 2021, northern Vietnam
 Arachotia tamdao Owada et Pham, 2021, northern Vietnam 
 Arachotia vespoides Moore, 1879, India

References
 Arachotia at funet.fi

Procridinae
Zygaenidae genera